The 1897–98 season was Newton Heath's sixth season in the Football League and their fourth in the Second Division. They finished fourth in the league, which was not enough to earn them a chance for promotion back to the First Division. In the FA Cup, the Heathens were knocked out by Liverpool in the Second Round, after beating Walsall in the First Round.

The club also entered teams in the Lancashire and Manchester Senior Cups in 1897–98. They reached the semi-finals of the Manchester Senior Cup before being beaten 2–1 by Manchester City in a replay, but they went two better in the Lancashire Senior Cup, beating Blackburn Rovers 2–1 in the final.

Second Division

FA Cup

1897-98
Newton Heath